This is a survey of the postage stamps and postal history of the Ryukyu Islands.

The Ryukyu Islands are a chain of islands in the western Pacific Ocean, on the eastern limit of the East China Sea and to the southwest of the island of Kyushu in Japan. The largest of the islands is Okinawa Island.

The Ryukyu Kingdom was formally annexed by the Empire of Japan in 1872, although the kingdom had been part of the feudal Satsuma Domain in Kyushu since the 1609 invasion. During World War II, folowing the Battle of Okinawa, the islands came under the occupation of the United States military in 1945, and a civilian government was set up under American control in 1952. The islands reverted to the control of Japan in 1972.

First stamps

The first definitive stamps of the Ryukyu Islands were issued on July 1, 1948, and the first commemorative stamps were issued on February 12, 1951.

The final Ryukyu Island stamp was a commemorative stamp issued on April 20, 1972, after which time stamps of Japan were valid.

See also
Postage stamps and postal history of Japan

References

Further reading
 Handbook and Specialized Catalogue of the Postal Issues of the Ryukyu (Liu Ch'iu) Islands (issued under United States administrations): Parts I-VIII; X. Berkeley, CA.: The Ryukyu Philatelic Specialist Society, 1978-2014
 Schoberlin, Melvin H. A Study of Major Errors of the Ryukyu Islands, plus a thimbleful of history. State College, PA.: American Philatelic Society, 1965 24p.
 Sera, Minoru and Nina S. Thomas. Ryukyus Handbook: Philatelic and Historic. Tokyo, 1963 238p.
 Tachikawa, Kenkichi. Handbook of Ryukyu Postage Stamps. s.l.: Japan Philatelic Society, 1973 174p.

External links
Ryukyu Islands: The often forgotten possession by Jack Searles.
The Ryukyu Philatelic Specialist Society.

Okinawa under United States occupation
Philately of Japan
Ryukyu Islands